The Monthly Magazine (1796–1843) of London began publication in February 1796.

Contributors
Richard Phillips was the publisher and a contributor on political issues. The editor for the first ten years was a literary jack-of-all-trades, Dr John Aikin. Other contributors included William Blake, Samuel Taylor Coleridge, George Dyer, Henry Neele, Charles Lamb, and James Hogg. The magazine also published the earliest fiction by Charles Dickens, the first of what would become Sketches by Boz. 

The circulation of the magazine in early 1830s was about 600. From 1839 the magazine was for two years edited by Francis Foster Barham and John Abraham Heraud. Its content in that period has been described by a recent American analyst as "popularizations of post-Kantian philosophy, esoteric mystical commentary, literary effusions, and idealistic calls for child-centered education and communitarian socialism."

See also
The New Monthly Magazine

References

Further reading

Monthly Magazine, or, British register. London: Printed for R. Phillips, 1796 onwards. 

Ward and Waller, eds. Cambridge History of English Literature, vol. 12. G. P. Putnam's Sons, 1916

1796 establishments in Great Britain
1843 disestablishments in the United Kingdom
Defunct magazines published in the United Kingdom
Magazines established in 1796
Magazines disestablished in 1843
Magazines published in London
Monthly magazines published in the United Kingdom